Tales from the Land of Milk and Honey is the fifth studio album by the Foreign Exchange, released in 2015. NPR listed it as one of the "Top 10 Slept-On R&B Albums of 2015".

Track listing

Charts

References

External links
 

2015 albums
The Foreign Exchange albums